Fram ("Forward") is a ship that was used in expeditions of the Arctic and Antarctic regions by the Norwegian explorers Fridtjof Nansen, Otto Sverdrup, Oscar Wisting, and Roald Amundsen between 1893 and 1912. It was designed and built by the Scottish-Norwegian shipwright Colin Archer for Fridtjof Nansen's 1893 Arctic expedition in which the plan was to freeze Fram  into the Arctic ice sheet and float with it over the North Pole.

Fram is preserved as a museum ship at the Fram Museum in Oslo, Norway.

Construction
Nansen's ambition was to explore the Arctic farther north than anyone else. To do that, he would have to deal with a problem that many sailing on the polar ocean had encountered before him: the freezing ice could crush a ship. Nansen's idea was to build a ship that could survive the pressure, not by pure strength, but because it would be of a shape designed to let the ice push the ship up, so it would "float" on top of the ice.

The ship is both unusually wide and unusually shallow in order to better withstand the forces of pressing ice.

Nansen commissioned the shipwright Colin Archer from Larvik to construct a vessel with these characteristics. Fram was built with an outer layer of greenheart wood to withstand the ice and with almost no keel to handle the shallow waters Nansen expected to encounter. The rudder and propeller were designed to be retracted. The ship was also carefully insulated to allow the crew to live on board for up to five years. The ship also included a windmill, which ran a generator to provide electric power for lighting by electric arc lamps.

Initially, Fram was fitted with a steam engine. Prior to Amundsen's expedition to the South Pole in 1910, the engine was replaced with a diesel engine, a first for polar exploration vessels.

The ship was launched on 26 October 1892.

Expeditions
Fram was used in several expeditions:

Nansen's 1893–1896 Arctic expedition

Nansen had Fram built in order to explore this theory.

He undertook an expedition that came to last three years. When Nansen realised that Fram would not reach the North Pole directly by the force of the current, he and Hjalmar Johansen set out to reach it on skis. After reaching 86° 14' north, he had to turn back to spend the winter at Franz Joseph Land. Nansen and Johansen survived on walrus and polar bear meat and blubber. Finally meeting British explorers, the Jackson-Harmsworth Expedition, they arrived back in Norway only days before the Fram also returned there. The ship had spent nearly three years trapped in the ice, reaching 85° 57' N.

Sverdrup's 1898–1902 Canadian Arctic islands expedition
In 1898, Otto Sverdrup, who had brought Fram back on the first Arctic voyage, led a scientific expedition to the Canadian Arctic Archipelago. Fram was slightly modified for this journey, its freeboard being increased. Fram left harbour on 24 June 1898, with 17 men on board. Their aim was to chart the lands of the Arctic Islands, and to sample the geology, flora and fauna. The expeditions lasted until 1902, leading to charts covering , more than any other Arctic expedition.

Amundsen's 1910–1912 South Pole expedition

Fram was used by Roald Amundsen in his southern polar expedition from 1910 to 1912, the first to reach the South Pole, during which Fram reached 78° 41' S.

Preservation of Fram
The ship was left to decay in storage from 1912 until the late 1920s, when Lars Christensen, Otto Sverdrup and Oscar Wisting initiated efforts to preserve her via the Fram Committee. In 1935, the ship was installed in the Fram Museum, where she now stands.

Named after Fram

 Fram Island (Ostrov Frama), an island close to the Komsomolskaya Pravda Islands, Laptev Sea
 Framheim (literally "Home of the Fram"), Amundsen's Base at the Bay of Whales in Antarctica during his quest for the South Pole
 Fram Rupes, an escarpment on Mercury
 Fram crater, a small crater on Mars, visited by the Mars Exploration Rover Opportunity in 2004
 Fram Basin, the deepest point in the Arctic Ocean
 Fram Strait, a passage from the Arctic Ocean to the Greenland Sea and Norwegian Sea, between Greenland and Spitsbergen.
 Fram, a play by Tony Harrison, premièred at the National Theatre London, 2008
 In Arthur Ransome's children's book, Winter Holiday, the children use the name Fram for their Uncle Jim's houseboat, trapped in the ice on the lake which becomes the inspiration for some of their adventures.
 The Adventures of Fram, the Polar Bear (Romanian: Aventurile lui Fram, ursul polar), a children's book written by the Romanian author Cezar Petrescu which was also made into a TV series in Romania;

See also
 List of Antarctic exploration ships from the Heroic Age, 1897–1922
List of museum ships
RRS Discovery, the only surviving Arctic exploration vessel besides Fram

References

External links 

 
 "The Polar Ship Fram" by the Fram Museum

1892 ships
Amundsen's South Pole expedition
Arctic exploration vessels
Exploration ships
Fridtjof Nansen
Icebreakers of Norway
Individual sailing vessels
Museum ships in Norway
Ships built in Norway
Tall ships of Norway
North Pole